The Loy Yang Power Station is a brown coal- fired thermal power station located on the outskirts of the city of Traralgon, in south-eastern Victoria, Australia. It consists of two sections, known as Loy Yang A (4 units) and Loy Yang B (2 units). Both Loy Yang A and B are supplied by the Loy Yang brown coal mine. The Loy Yang power stations are located in the brown coal rich Latrobe Valley, along with the Yallourn power station.

If Loy Yang A and Loy Yang B are counted together they are the largest power station in Australia, generating 3280 MW of power (however, if counted separately, the 2,880 MW Eraring power station is the largest). Loy Yang A & B are base load power stations, and together produce 50% of Victoria's electricity requirements. Loy Yang also serves as the mainland connection point for the Basslink electricity interconnector cable which runs under Bass Strait, connecting it to the George Town sub-station in Northern Tasmania.

Technical Features 

All six Loy Yang boilers are of the forced circulation tower type and are made by International Combustion Australia Ltd. Steam is supplied at a pressure of 16 MPa and a temperature of 540 °C.

Loy Yang A 
Loy Yang A consists of three units with Kraftwerk Union alternators (units 1, 3 and 4) and one unit by Brown Boveri Corp (unit 2) that was supposed to be the second unit at the gas-fired Newport power station. Later during the 2000s the turbine/generator couplings were upgraded on the 3 Kraftwerk Union units to allow an increase in MCR to 560 MW. Loy Yang A is the mainland connection point for the Basslink electricity interconnector cable.

Loy Yang B 

The two units have Hitachi turbo generators.

Loy Yang B employs up to 152 full-time staff and another 40 contractors. It is Victoria's newest and most efficient brown coal-fired power station and can generate approximately 17% of Victoria's power needs.

Fuel supply 
Four giant bucket-wheel excavators, called dredgers, operate 24 hours a day in the Loy Yang open cut mine, mostly feeding coal directly to the boilers via conveyor belt, 18 hours of reserve supply is held in a  coal bunker. The current mining licence has been extended by the Victorian Government up to the year 2065.

History

The squatter James Rintoul established a stock run at the place where Sheepwash Creek meets the Latrobe River, which he named "Loy Yang".

Loy Yang facility was originally constructed through the 1980s by International Combustion Australia Ltd, who was contracted by the government owned State Electricity Commission of Victoria (SECV). It consists of two separate units, Loy Yang A and Loy Yang B. Constructed in stages, it was originally planned that the Loy Yang complex would consist of eight generating units, of  each upon completion. The privatization of the SECV resulted in only six generating units being completed, four in Loy Yang A and two in Loy Yang B. The chimneys were constructed by Thiess Contractors.

The Loy Yang complex was privatised in 1995, as were most of the assets of the SECV. Prior to the Victorian Government's privatisations from the mid-1990s, a 51% stake of Loy Yang B was sold to Mission Energy. Later Edison Mission bought the complete plant, and later again sold it to the joint venture International Power Mitsui.

In 1995, Loy Yang B was the world's first coal-fired power station to gain quality accreditation to ISO 9001 and the first Australian power station to gain environmental accreditation to ISO 14001.

In March 2010 it was announced that the operators of Loy Yang A (Loy Yang Power) signed a contract with Alcoa World Alumina and Chemicals Australia for the supply of electricity to power aluminium smelters at Portland and Point Henry until 2036. The Point Henry Smelter ceased operation in 2014 and is now closed. In June 2012 AGL Energy acquired Loy Yang A and the Loy Yang coal mine.

In June 2012 AGL Energy acquired Loy Yang A and the Loy Yang coal mine. In 2020, AGL announced plans to build a 200 MW / 800 MWh (4 hours) battery storage power station at Loy Yang A to increase flexibility.

Until November 2017, Loy Yang B was jointly owned by Engie (formerly GDF Suez Australia), which held a 70% stake, and Mitsui & Co Ltd with 30%. In November 2017, Engie sold Loy Yang B to Chow Tai Fook Enterprises for a reported AU$1.2 billion, despite some reported that it was acquired by Chow Tai Fook Enterprises' subsidiary Alinta Energy instead.

Greenhouse gas emissions 
Carbon Monitoring for Action estimates this power station emits  of greenhouse gases each year as a result of burning coal. On 3 September 2007 the Loy Yang complex was the target of climate change activists. The activists locked themselves to conveyor belts and reduced power production for several hours before being cut free. Four people were arrested.

On 23 September 2021 Environment Victoria took legal action against AGL Energy, which owns Loy Yang A (and also EnergyAustralia, owner of Yallourn power station, and Alinta at Loy Yang B) for failure to manage climate pollution, in a case that was the first to test the Victorian government’s climate change laws.

Engineering heritage award 
The power station received an Engineering Heritage Marker from Engineers Australia as part of its Engineering Heritage Recognition Program.

Future

In September 2022, AGL announced that Loy Yang A would close in 2035.  

Alinta Energy, the owner of Loy Yang B, has announced an intention to operate it until 2047.  However, the state government has announced a target that 95% of Victoria's electricity will be generated by renewable energy by 2035.  It would be impossible to meet this target if Loy Yang B continued to operate in its present form.  The Premier of Victoria, Daniel Andrews, has stated that it is unlikely to operate to the previously announced closure date.

Gallery

See also

 List of power stations in Victoria
 State Electricity Commission of Victoria

References

External links
 Loy Yang Power
 International Power
 Australian Energy Market Operator Participant Registration List

Coal-fired power stations in Victoria (Australia)
1985 establishments in Australia
Traralgon
Energy infrastructure completed in 1985
Recipients of Engineers Australia engineering heritage markers